Two Letter Alibi is a 1962 British crime film directed by Robert Lynn and starring Peter Williams, Petra Davies and Ursula Howells.

It was made at Shepperton Studios as a second feature. The sets were designed by the art director George Provis. The film was distributed on the Odeon Circuit on a double-bill with Walk on the Wild Side.

Cast

References

Bibliography
 Chibnall, Steve & McFarlane, Brian. The British 'B' Film. Palgrave MacMillan, 2009.

External links

1962 films
British crime films
1962 crime films
Films directed by Robert Lynn
Films shot at Shepperton Studios
British Lion Films films
1960s English-language films
1960s British films